Hypogymnia laxa is a species of foliose lichen in the family Parmeliaceae. Found in the Chinese Himalayas, it was described as a new species by Bruce McCune in 2003. Here it was found growing on the bark and wood of Abies, Pinus, and Rhododendron. The lichen is characterized by a thallus with soredia, the presence of physodalic acid in the medulla, and rimmed holes on the lower surface. This latter feature distinguishes it from the morphologically similar Hypogymnia pseudophysodes, which always has unrimmed holes.

References

laxa
Lichen species
Lichens of China
Lichens described in 2003
Taxa named by Bruce McCune